The Fletcher–Salmons Building is an historic building in San Diego, California, in the United States.

References

External links
 

Buildings and structures in San Diego